Herbert Kuhl  is a German gynecologist who has published extensively in the areas of estrogens, progestogens, menopause, hormonal contraception, and menopausal hormone therapy. His works include numerous original and review articles and several books. Kuhl is a member of many medical societies and has received various scientific awards.

Among Kuhl's most widely cited publications is his 2005 literature review in the journal Climacteric, Pharmacology of Estrogens and Progestogens: Influence of Different Routes of Administration. He has published several articles interpreting the findings of the Women's Health Initiative (WHI) study.

Kuhl was born in Aschaffenburg, Germany in 1940. He was educated at the Goethe University Frankfurt from 1961 to 1977. Kuhl first published in 1970. From 1981, he was a professor at the Universitäts-Frauenklinik (University Women's Clinic) of the Goethe University Frankfurt. Until 2013, Kuhl continued to be affiliated with this institution. Since then however, he has listed no affiliation in his publications except that he resides in Aschaffenburg, Germany.

Selected publications

Books

Authored books
  (1st and only edition)
  (1st edition published in 1981)
  (1st edition published in 1996)
  (Earlier editions published in 1999 (1st), 2001 (2nd), and 2005/2006 (3rd))
  (1st and only edition)

Edited books
 
 
 
 
  (1st edition published in 2000)

Book chapters

Journal articles

Reviews

Studies

Theses/dissertations

References

German gynaecologists
German medical researchers
Living people
1940 births